Air Premia is a budget hybrid carrier based in Seoul, South Korea. The airline was founded in 2017 by the former president of Jeju Air, Kim Jong-Chul.

Operations 
The company was established on July 27, 2017, by the ex-president of Jeju Air , Kim Jong-Chul. In April 2019, the airline intended to launch in 2020 and lease three Boeing 787-9 from Aircraft Lease Corporation (ALC), but announced and agreed to buy five. Air Premia was initially expected to launch its flight to a regional routes within Asia, but  already had U.S. destinations on their radar. They are initially planning routes to the US and Australia from its base in 2021.

In April 2021, they received their first Boeing 787-9 and are planning to operate 10 aircraft by the end of 2024.

On 11 August 2021, the airline started flights between Seoul and Jeju. The domestic flight ended on 30 October 2021 for preparation of international routes.

Destinations 
, Air Premia operates or has operated to the following destinations:

Fleet 
, Air Premia operates the following aircraft:

References

External links 

Airlines of South Korea
Low-cost carriers
Companies based in Seoul
South Korean companies established in 2017
Airlines established in 2017